Hawley Street of Boston, Massachusetts, is located in the Financial District between Milk and Summer Streets. Prior to 1799, it was called Bishop's Alley and briefly in the 1790s Board Alley.

History

17th century
According to historian Annie Haven Thwing, in 1645 the path that later would become Hawley Street was "laid out through the gardens towards the south windmill, between the houses of Amos Richardson and John Palmer on Summer Street." In the 17th century people referred to it as "'the lane in which the house of Gilbert the tanner stands,' 'a little lane formerly called Gilbert's lane.'"

18th century

After 1728, the lane was "a path through a pasture made by the worshippers of Trinity Church, who lived in King Street." Because the terrain consisted of a marshy bog, wooden planks were laid down to facilitate travel, and so it was referred to as "Board Alley."

In 1792, theatre enthusiasts organized an illegal theatre, the Board Alley Theatre, also called the "New Exhibition Room." With mixed popular opinion, governor John Hancock shut it down in June 1793.

19th century

Around the early 19th century, politicians James Sullivan and William Gray lived on the corner of Hawley and Summer Streets. In December 1810, a fire began at Stephen Soper's livery stable, spreading from Hawley to Milk Street, and burning the former home of Benjamin Franklin.

When Melvil Dewey lived in Boston in the 1870s, he served as an officer of the Spelling Reform Association, headquartered at 32 Hawley St.

References

External links

 Bostonian Society  has materials related to the street.
 Library of Congress. Lithograph published by James H. Earle, 20 Hawley Street, 1875.
 MIT. Photo, ca.1954
 Flickr. Photo of Filenes on Hawley, 2008
 Flickr. Corner of Franklin Street and Hawley Street, 2008
 Flickr. Photo, 2009
 Flickr. Photo, 2009

Streets in Boston
History of Boston
Financial District, Boston